Tårnby Boldklub (or Taarnby Boldklub) were a Danish football club based in Tårnby on Amager, which played their home games at Taarnby Stadium. The club was formed on 21 April 1935 as Arbejdernes Idræts Klub Tårnby (AIK Tårnby) and became member of Dansk Arbejder Idrætsforbund (DAI) on 1 May 1935. After nearly 10 years in DAI, it was decided at a general meeting on 16 January 1944 to change their membership to Københavns Boldspil-Union (KBU) and in this regard change their name to Tårnby Boldklub. The club became an extraordinary member of KBU on 1 July 1944 and a full member in February 1945 and started their first season 1944–45 under the new football association by playing in a newly created 'C-række' consisting of 8 clubs. The club enjoyed rivalries against neighbouring clubs Kastrup Boldklub and in the early days Sundby Boldklub. In 2002 the club together with Kastrup Boldklub became a part of the superstructure Amager United. In 2006, Kastrup Boldklub, however withdrew from the collaboration and the superstructure was dissolved. On 1 January 2009, the club merged with neibouring Amager Boldklub af 1970 (AB70), and the new association was named AB Tårnby.

Achievements
6 seasons in the Third Highest Danish League

Club's honours

Domestic
 Københavnsserien (V under KBU)
 Winners (2): 1977 (A), 1984
 Runner-Up (3): 1973 (A), 1976 (A), 1989‡
 Mellemrækken (V under KBU)
 Winners (1): 1955–56
 Runners-up (1): 1954–55
 A-rækken (VI under KBU)
 Winners (1): 1952–53
 B-rækken (VII under KBU)
 Winners (1): 1947–48
 Triangelpokalen
 Winners (2): 1951, 1952
 A-rækken (II under DAI)
 Winners (1): 1941–42
 DAI's pokalturnering
 Winners (1): 1941–42

‡: Won by reserve team

References

External links

Football clubs in Denmark
Tårnby Municipality
Association football clubs established in 1935
1935 establishments in Denmark
2009 disestablishments in Denmark